Paolo Persoglia (born 28 April 1994) is a Sanmarrinese judoka.

Personal life
He is able to represent Italy or San Marino.

Career
Between 2013 and 2019 Persoglia has medalled at the Games of the Small States of Europe winning two silver and 2 bronze medals. He has also competed at the 2010 Summer Youth Olympics in Singapore.

He was selected to compete at the 2019 World Championships in Tokyo, as well as the 2020 Summer Games where he was drawn to face Noël van 't End, the gold medalist at the 2019 world championships and number 2 in the world. Persoglia lost by ippon after half a minute.

References

External links
 

1994 births
Living people
Sammarinese male judoka
Olympic judoka of San Marino
Judoka at the 2020 Summer Olympics
Judoka at the 2010 Summer Youth Olympics